The Quardu Gboni District is the newest of the seven administrative districts of Lofa County in Liberia. The district is predominantly Mandingo (99%) who are all Maliki Muslims. According to LISGIS 2008 report, the region is about a little over 33,000 hectares of land with over thirty human settlements. Some eminent citizens that hail from the District include the late Edward Kesselly, founding father of Liberia current ruling party (Unity Party), G. V. Kromah, Esq. a former resistance leader, a  renowned veteran journalist, lawyer and a writer, Mariamu Beyan Fofana, current lawmaker of the district.
Barkedu is the largest and most populous town in the district which was currently declared a township through legislation by the effort of Hon. Fofana. The current representative as well as Prof. Kromah hails from Tusu Town, the District's second largest and second most populated settlement only surpassed by Barkedu. 

Districts of Liberia
Lofa County